Arnaud Duchesne (born 3 May 1978) is a Belgian rower. He competed in the men's quadruple sculls event at the 2000 Summer Olympics.

References

1978 births
Living people
Belgian male rowers
Olympic rowers of Belgium
Rowers at the 2000 Summer Olympics
Sportspeople from Liège